The Oxford Dictionary of Late Antiquity (ODLA) is the first comprehensive, multi-disciplinary reference work covering culture, history, religion, and life in Late Antiquity. This was the period in Europe, the Mediterranean, and the Near East from about AD 250 to 750. Written by more than 400 contributors and edited by Oliver Nicholson, the Oxford Dictionary of Late Antiquity was published in 2018. It connects the period in history between those covered in the Oxford Classical Dictionary and The Oxford Dictionary of the Middle Ages. The print edition is in two volumes, Volume I: A–I; Volume II: J–Z.

Sources
 

2018 non-fiction books
Encyclopedias of history
Oxford dictionaries
Late antiquity